"Ain't Nothin' Goin' On but the Rent" is a 1986 song by American singer Gwen Guthrie. It was released as the lead single from her fourth album, Good to Go Lover (1986), on Polydor Records. It became the biggest hit of Guthrie's career, and the song's title became a semi-popular catchphrase among many women throughout the late 1980s and early 1990s. The single peaked at number five in the UK, but hit number-one in New Zealand, Zimbabwe and on the US Billboard Hot Dance Club Play. In 1993, it was remixed and again charted in the UK, peaking at number 42. In 2005, Blender listed "Ain't Nothin' Goin' On but the Rent" as number 339 on its list of "Greatest Songs Since You Were Born".

Critical reception
Alan Jones from Music Week gave the 1993 remix three out of five. He wrote, "A disappointing seven-inch remix by Nigel Wright is stale and one-dimensional, but the original, still sounding fresh, and a radical E-Lustrious remix are more than enough to score a hit." James Hamilton from the magazine's RM Dance Update noted, "1986 garage anthem's radical blippily thundering E-Lusirious, breezily soulful Nigel Wright Remixes, ponderously lurching Original".

Chart performance
The song was a major hit on both sides of the Atlantic, mostly in dance clubs and on the radio, charting moderately on the US pop chart (reaching number 42 on the Billboard Hot 100), but faring better on the Billboard R&B chart where it spent one week at number-one and on the Billboard Hot Dance Club Play chart where it spent two weeks at the top. The song peaked at number-one in New Zealand and Zimbabwe, and was also successful in parts of Europe, reaching number five on the UK Singles Chart. The 1993 remix reached number eight on the UK Dance Singles Chart.

Charts

Weekly charts

Year-end charts

References to other songs
The song contains apparent references to at least three other songs:

The line "Ain't nothing goin' on now, but the rent-uh" appears in the 1972 James Brown hit "Get on the Good Foot — Pt. 1".

The line "You got to have a J-O-B if you want to be-with-me" is set to a melody line that recurs throughout "Doctor Love", a 1977 disco hit by First Choice.

The line "Nothing from nothing leaves nothing" is taken from Billy Preston's 1974 hit song of the same name.

Covers and pop culture references

 This song, specifically the line, "what can you do for me?" was sampled by Utah Saints in their 1991 UK top ten hit, "What Can You Do For Me".
 The song has been referenced numerous times in popular culture, including songs with similar messages, such as Destiny's Child's "Bills, Bills, Bills". The last stanza of Blackstreet's song "No Diggity" uses the title line.
 Rapper Foxy Brown released a cover version of the song, titled "JOB", which also featured Mýa.
 It appeared on Brown's 1999 album Chyna Doll.
 Comedian Eddie Murphy cited the song's title and lyrics in his 1987 stand-up comedy movie Raw as reflective of the materialism of American women at the time.
 In the 1994 film House Party 3, Reynaldo Rey used the lyric: "No romance without finance" to convey to  Kid, how the lack of employment was a deal breaker.
 In the comedy series Martin, "Ain't Nuttin' Goin' on But the Rent" was the name of Episode 16 of Season 3 in 1995 where Martin refused to pay a 5% rent increase to his landlord.
 The song was also used in the 8th episode of season 5 of RuPaul's Drag Race, when contestants Alyssa Edwards and Ivy Winters had to lip sync to it to avoid elimination.
The song was used again in the second season of RuPaul's Secret Celebrity Drag Race.

See also
List of number-one dance singles of 1986 (U.S.)
List of number-one R&B singles of 1986 (U.S.)

References

1986 singles
1993 singles
1986 songs
Number-one singles in New Zealand
Number-one singles in Zimbabwe
Songs written by Gwen Guthrie
Polydor Records singles
Songs with feminist themes